Huntington's disease-like syndromes (HD-like syndromes, or HDL syndromes) are a family of inherited neurodegenerative diseases that closely resemble Huntington's disease (HD) in that they typically produce a combination of chorea, cognitive decline or dementia and behavioural or psychiatric problems.

Types

HDL1 
HDL1 is an unusual, autosomal dominant familial prion disease. Only described in one family, it is caused by an eight-octapeptide repeat insertion in the PRNP gene. More broadly, inherited prion diseases in general can mimic HD.

HDL2 
HDL2 is the most common HD-like syndrome and is caused by CTG/CAG triplet expansions in the JPH3 gene encoding junctophilin-3. It is almost exclusively restricted to populations of African descent and is actually more common than Huntington's disease in Black South Africans.

HDL3 
HDL3 is a rare, autosomal recessive disorder linked to chromosome 4p15.3. It has only been reported in two families, and the causative gene is unidentified.

Other 
Other neurogenetic disorders can cause an HD-like or HD phenocopy syndrome but are not solely defined as HDL syndromes. The commonest is spinocerebellar ataxia type 17 (SCA-17), occasionally called HDL-4. Others include mutations in C9orf72, spinocerebellar ataxias type 1 and 3, neuroacanthocytosis, dentatorubral-pallidoluysian atrophy (DRPLA), brain iron accumulation disorders, Wilson's disease, benign hereditary chorea, Friedreich's ataxia and mitochondrial diseases.

A Huntington's disease-like presentation may also be caused by acquired causes.

References

External links

Rare syndromes
Extrapyramidal and movement disorders
Genetic diseases and disorders
Systemic atrophies primarily affecting the central nervous system
Autosomal dominant disorders
Trinucleotide repeat disorders
Huntington's disease